The 2023 SWAC Women's Basketball Tournament will be the postseason women's basketball tournament for the 2022–23 season in the Southwestern Athletic Conference (SWAC). The tournament will be held from March 8–11, 2023. The tournament winner will receive an automatic invitation to the 2023 NCAA Division I Men's Basketball Tournament. The tournament will be sponsored by Cricket Wireless.

Seeds 
Teams will be seeded by record within the conference, with a tie–breaker system to seed teams with identical conference records. Only the top eight teams in the conference will qualify for the tournament.

Schedule

Bracket

References 

2022–23 Southwestern Athletic Conference women's basketball season
SWAC women's basketball tournament
Basketball competitions in Birmingham, Alabama
College basketball tournaments in Alabama
SWAC women's basketball tournament
SWAC women's basketball tournament